Leonardo Henrique Peixoto dos Santos, or simply Henrique (born July 16, 1977 in Rio de Janeiro), is a Brazilian football centre-back. He currently plays for Peñarol.

References

1977 births
Living people
Brazilian footballers
CR Vasco da Gama players
PFC Litex Lovech players
Clube Atlético Mineiro players
Fluminense FC players
Peñarol players
Goiás Esporte Clube players
Expatriate footballers in Uruguay
Expatriate footballers in Bulgaria
First Professional Football League (Bulgaria) players
Association football defenders
Footballers from Rio de Janeiro (city)